Beijing University of Technology, also called Beijing Polytechnic University or Bei Gong Da, is recognized as one of the Project 211 universities. The university has established a multidisciplinary academic structure, offering a variety of programs, and is involved in diversified research in the fields of Science, Engineering, Economics, Management, Liberal Arts, and Law. It is a Chinese state Double First Class University Plan university, as identified by the Ministry of Education.

As a traditional engineering university, its engineering research has a remarkable reputation in Asia, especially in electronic science, civil engineering, environmental science, microelectronics, and mechanical engineering.

Beijing University of Technology has been ranked among top 400-500 global universities by Academic Ranking of World Universities 2022, and 643rd globally and 145th in Asia as of 2022 by the US News & World Report Best Global University Ranking.

History

Beijing University of Technology was founded in 1960 with five engineering departments. The first group of students was transferred from the Beijing Institute of Technology and Beijing Normal University.

In 1981, the Beijing University of Technology formed the graduate school; in 1985, the school started granting the Doctoral degrees with international standard (the first batch of university in China to award doctoral degrees).

In 1990, Beijing Tech acquired the College of Economics and Management from Beijing Union University, and later, in 1993, the Beijing Computer Institute became part of the university as the College of Computer Science. In 1993, Beijing Tech formed the Experimental College by cooperating with local business, which later became an independent college. Over the decades, the social sciences also grew to play a significant role in the university. The achievements of faculties in facets of Economics, Law and other social sciences further indicate that this university has been changed into a de facto comprehensive university with wide variety of schools and colleges. As of today, its primary achievements are mainly focused on engineering research and education.

Organization
Beijing Tech is a key university under the jurisdiction of the Beijing Municipal Government. It has the following colleges (faculties):

College of Applied Mathematical and Physical Science
College of Architecture and Urban Planning
College of Architecture Engineering
College of Arts
College of Economics and Management (including: Faculty of Law)
College of Computer Science
College of Continuing Education
College of Electronic Information and Control Engineering
College of Energy and Environmental Engineering
College of Foreign Languages 
College of Humanities and Social Science
College of Life Science and Bioengineering 
College of Mechanical Engineering and Applied Electronics Technology
College of Materials Science and Engineering 
College of Metropolitan Transportation
College of Microelectronics
College of Software Engineering
Institute of Laser Engineering (National Center of Laser Technology)
Gengdan College (Independent College)
Experimental College (Independent College)
Division of Physical Education
Fan Gongxiu Honors College of Beijing University of Technology 
Beijing Dublin International College

Campus

Beijing University of Technology is located in southeastern Beijing. The campus covers an area of about 800,000 square metres, with 4,940,000 square meters of floor space.

Beijing Tech's main library is a modern complex occupying a floor area of more than 20,000 square meters. The library houses about 700,000 printed materials, 60,000 e-books, and more than 40 kinds of database resources, forming a documentation resource system which meets the demands of teaching and research. The library also cooperates with the Capital Library of Beijing and the Information Centre of the Chinese Academy of Science, providing professional services to the student and faculty.

Beijing Tech was selected to host the Badminton competitions of the 2008 Beijing Olympic Games. A new athletic gymnasium was formed as a response to this, with it completed in September 2007 after meeting the requirements of the International Olympic Committee.

Academics

Undergraduate programs
The university upholds the principle that its purpose is to provide a stable and smooth process of undergraduate education. The premise for such education is that the supply of educated and trained personnel is fundamental to the success of China's future development and growth. As a result, it has developed an undergraduate education system with three main categories: science, engineering and management. At present, there are 6,811 undergraduate students studying 26 disciplines in 16 departments of the university.

Graduate and Professional Programs
The graduate education or studies programs of the university are matched to the needs of the economic construction and social development programs of Beijing and China as a whole. It aims to improve educational quality, and consistently optimize and develop the scale, quality, efficiency and structure of graduate education. The graduate studies school is the department in which both the graduate studies and scientific research programs are undertaken.

The School of Higher Professional Education, founded in July 1996, has a staff of more than 120 persons. Of the staff, five are professors and 29 are associate professors. The four departments are: Basic Course, Information Technology, Engineering Technology, Economics and Management. The disciplines include: e-business, computer science and application, internet and office automation, information and telecommunication engineering, telecom and network engineering, information and applied software, financial accounting, environmental engineering, architectural technology, and concise chemistry. The school has established laboratories and an intern training base for higher professional education, and built cooperative education programs with Japan, Russia, etc. There are presently more than 1300 students enrolled in the School.

Rankings 
Beijing University of Technology has been ranked among top 400-500 global universities by Academic Ranking of World Universities 2022, and 643rd globally and 145th in Asia as of 2022 by the US News & World Report Best Global University Ranking.

Student life

There are more than 21,000 students enrolled in Beijing Tech, of whom around 13,000 are undergraduate students, more than 8,000 are master's degree students, around 1,000 are doctoral degree students, and 500 are international students. In addition to these students, there are over 10,000 continuing education students.

Notable alumni
Xiaodong Zhang - Robert M. Critchfield Professor in Computer Architecture and Chairman of Department of Computer Science and Engineering at the Ohio State University 
Chen Tong - vice-president and chief editor, SINA.com
Dong Lu - vice-chief editor, Sports Youth Weekly
Bau Fen- CEO, East Gate Export
Wang Chao - vice-chairman, China Computer World Publishing & Servicing Co. Chief Editor of IT CEO & CIO China
Wang Longbin - chairman of Beijing Xinhao
Wu Ying - president of UTStarcom
Yang Shaofeng - chairman, LT Technology Corporation
Zhang Rongming - vice chairwoman, Chinese People's Political Consultative Conference
Zhou Zhixiong - chairman, Softbank Asia Infrastructure Fund
Zhu Weisha - president and CEO, Yuxing Electronic and Technology Co.
Wang Chuan - XiaoMi Company Co-founder,Distinguish Vice President, Chief Strategy officer
Wang Xiang - XiaoMi Company Vice President

References

See also 
 High School Attached to Beijing University of Technology
 Campus real three-dimensional map

 
Universities and colleges in Beijing
Technical universities and colleges in China
Project 211
Educational institutions established in 1960
1960 establishments in China
Schools in Chaoyang District, Beijing